Robert Bateman Secondary is a public high school in Abbotsford, British Columbia. The school is part of the School District 34 of Abbotsford. The Canadian painter and naturalist Robert Bateman, whom the school has been named after, annually visited the school in the past. The school has won awards based on its Computer and Arts Programs as well as enjoyed the success in athletics.

Sports 
The school's athletic programs include football, girls' volleyball, boys' and girls' basketball, boys' and girls' rugby, golf, and hockey. 

In 2018, the varsity football team lost in the provincial final (AA). In June 2019, the Robert Bateman Timberwolves senior boys' rugby team came 2nd in the province (AAA) while the girls' rugby team placed 3rd in the province (AA).

Notable alumni
Josh Thiel, rugby player

References 

High schools in Abbotsford, British Columbia
Educational institutions established in 1993
1993 establishments in British Columbia